Takalar Regency is a regency of South Sulawesi Province, Indonesia. It covers an area of 566.51 km2 and had a population of 269,603 at the 2010 census and 300,853 at the 2020 census; the official estimate for mid 2021 was 302,695. The entire regency lies within the official metropolitan area of the city of Makassar (the metropolitan area is known as Mamminasata). The principal towns are at Galesong and Takalar, but the administrative centre is at Pattallassang.

Administrative division 
At the 2010 census the regency was divided into nine districts, but a tenth district (Kepulauan Tanakeke) was subsequently cut out of Mappakusunggu District. The districts are tabulated below with their areras and their population totals from the 2010 census and the 2020 census, together with the official estimates for mid 2021. The table also includes the number of administrative villages (rural desa and urban kelurahan) in each district, and its postal codes.

Notes: (a) comprises a group of eight offshore islands. (b) the 2010 figures are included in the figures for Mappakusunggu District. (c) includes offshore island of Pulau Sanrobengi.

The regency is virtually split into two parts, with part of Gowa Regency nearly reaching the coast between Galesong Selatan and Sanrobone districts. The northern part (the three Galesong districts) forms an urbanised narrow coastal strip stretching south from Makassar city, plus the small offshore island of Pulau Sanrobengi; it covers 65.75 km2 with over 110,000 inhabitants in 2021. The larger southern area comprise the remaining seven districts.

References

Regencies of South Sulawesi